Richard Bornat (born 1944), is a British author and researcher in the field of computer science. He is also professor of Computer programming at Middlesex University. Previously he was at Queen Mary, University of London.

Research 

Bornat's research interests includes program proving in separation logic. His focus is on the proofs themselves; as opposed to any logical underpinnings. Much of the work involves discovering ways to state the properties of independent modules, in a manner that makes their composition into useful systems conducive.

Bornat (in conjunction with Bernard Sufrin of the Oxford University Computing Laboratory) developed Jape, a proof calculator; he is involved in research on the usability of this tool for exploration of novel proofs.

Richard Bornat's PhD students have included Samson Abramsky in the early 1980s.

In 2004, one of Bornat's students developed an aptitude test to "divide people up into programmers and non-programmers before they ever come into contact with programming." The test was first given to a group of students in 2005 during an experiment on the use of mental models in programming. In 2008 and 2014, Bornat partially retracted some of the claims, impugning its validity as a test for programming capability.

Publications 

Bornat published a book entitled "Understanding and Writing Compilers: A Do It Yourself Guide", which is regarded as one of the most extensive resources on compiler development. Although it has been out of print for some time, he has now made it available as an online edition.

Other publications from Bornat include:
 R. Bornat; 1987; Programming from First Principles; Prentice Hall International Series in Computer Science; .
 Richard Bornat and Harold Thimbleby; 1989; The life and times of ded, display editor; in J.B. Long & A. Whitefield (eds); Cognitive Ergonomics and Human-Computer Interaction; Cambridge University Press; pp. 225–255.
 Richard Bornat and Bernard Sufrin;1999; Animating Formal Proof at the Surface: The {Jape} Proof Calculator; The Computer Journal; Vol. 42; no. 3; pp. 177–192.
 Aczel, J. C., Fung, P., Bornat, R., Oliver, M., O'Shea, T., & Sufrin, B.; 1999; Influences of Software Design on Formal Reasoning; in Brewster, S., Cawsey, A. & Cockton, G. (Eds.) Proceedings of IFIP TC.13 International Conference on Human-Computer Interaction INTERACT '99; Vol. 2; pp. 3–4; Swindon, UK, British Computer Society; .
 R. Bornat; 2000; Proving Pointer Programs in Hoare Logic; in Backhouse & Oliveira (eds) MPC 2000; LNCS 1837; pp. 102–126.
 C. Calcagno, P. O'Hearn, R. Bornat; 2002; Program Logic and Equivalence in the Presence of Garbage Collection. To appear in Theoretical Computer Science special issue on Foundations.

References

External links 
 Richard Bornat (home page)
 Page at Middlesex University

1944 births
English computer scientists
English non-fiction writers
Academics of Queen Mary University of London
Academics of Middlesex University
Formal methods people
Living people
English male non-fiction writers